Félicité is a 1979 French film by Christine Pascal.

Pascal was the sole screenwriter of this film.

References

External links
 

1979 films
French drama films
1970s French-language films
1970s French films